The Red Tower in Halle (German: Der Rote Turm in Halle) is an oil on canvas painting by the German expressionist painter Ernst Ludwig Kirchner, executed in 1915. It is now housed at Museum Folkwang, Essen.

Description
The painting shows the market square in the town of Halle with the Red Tower. The 15th century neo-Gothic bell tower surmounts a red brick building. On the left stands the Marktkirche with its four towers. Only the tram crosses the deserted square. The view is plunging and unfolds parallel to the plane of the painting. Clouds of smoke in the background recall the proximity of war.

References

1915 paintings
Paintings by Ernst Ludwig Kirchner
Collection of the Museum Folkwang